This is presenting a complete list in alphabetical order of the cricketers who have played for the Bangladesh national under-19 cricket team. Like other team lists, details are the player's name followed by his years active in the Under-19 team, current players to the end of the 2015–16 season.

Please to note that the list includes players who have not (yet) gone on to appear in first-class or List A cricket. These players' names are unlinked, as Under-19 players only they are not complying with WP:NCRIC.

A
 MD RABIUL ISLAM ROBI (2014–15 to 2015–16)
 Abdul Qayium (2014)
 Abdur Rashid (2010–11)
 Abu Hider (2012 to 2013–14)
 Abu Jayed (2009 to 2012)
 Abu Sayeem (2013 to 2013–14)
 Abul Bashar (2003–04)
 Abul Hasan (2009 to 2009–10)
 Aftab Ahmed (2001–02 to 2004)
 Aftabul Islam (1994–95)
 Ahsanullah Hasan (1997–98)
 Al-Amin Abdullah (1989–90)
 Al-Amin (2011–12 to 2012)
 Alauddin Babu (2009 to 2009–10)
 Ali Arman (2001–02)
 Al Sahariar (1995–96 to 1997–98)
 Aminul Islam Bulbul (1989–90)
 Amit Majumder (2007–08 to 2009–10)
 Anamul Haque (2009 to 2012)
 Anisur Rahman (1989–90)
 Anwar Hossain Monir (1999–2000)
 Arafat Sunny (2003–04)
 Ariful Haque (2007)
 Ariful Islam (2015–16)
 Arman Badshah (2009–10)
 Arman Hossain (1999–2000)
 Ashim Chowdhury (2004)
 Ashiqul Islam (2007–08)
 Ashiqur Rahman (2001–02)
 Ashiqur Rahman, born 1986 (2003–04)
 Ashraful Aziz (2007 to 2007–08)
 Ashraful Hossain (2007–08)
 Asif Ahmed (2009 to 2012)
 Aslam Hossain (2010–11 to 2012)
 Aslam Khan (2005–06)
 Atiar Rahman (1994–95 to 1995–96)

D
 Dewan Sabbir (2011–12 to 2012)
 Dhiman Ghosh (2003–04 to 2004)
 Dolar Mahmud (2005–06 to 2007–08)

E
 Ehsanul Haque (1997–98)
 Enamul Haque (2003–04 to 2004)

F
 Fahim Muntasir (1997–98 to 1999)

G
 Gazi Salahuddin (2001–02)
 Golam Kibria (2007 to 2007–08)
 Golam Mortaza (1997–98 to 1999)

H
 Habibul Bashar (1989–90)
 Halim Shah (1989–90)
 Hamidul Islam (2007 to 2007–08)
 Hannan Sarkar (1997–98 to 1999–2000)
 Hasibul Haque (2001–02)
 Hasibul Hossain (1994–95 to 1995–96)
 Humayun Kabir (2005–06)

I
 Iftekhar Nayem (2007)
 Iftikharul Islam (2003–04)
 Imamul Hossain (2009 to 2009–10)
 Imran Ahmed (1999)
 Imran Rahim (1999)
 Irfan Sukkur (2009)
 Ishraq Sonet (2004 to 2005–06)

J
 Jahangir Alam (1989–90)
 Jakir Ali (2014–15 to 2015–16)
 Jashimuddin (2011–12 to 2013–14)
 Javed Omar (1989–90 to 1994)
 Jewel Hossain (1995–96)
 Joyraz Sheik (2013 to 2015–16)
 Jubair Hossain (2010–11 to 2013–14)

K
 Kamrul Islam Imon (2003–04)
 Kamrul Islam Rabbi (2009 to 2009–10)
 Kazi Hasibul Haque (2001-02)
 Kazi Kamrul Islam (2005–06)
 Kazi Anik (2014–15)
 Khaled Mahmud (1989–90)
 Khaled Mashud (1994)
 Kuntal Chandra (1999–2000)

L
 Liton Das (2010–11 to 2013–14)

M
 Mafizul Islam (1994)
 Mahbubur Rahman (1989–90)
 Mahfuz Kabir (1999–2000)
 Mahmudul Hasan (2007 to 2009–10)
 Mahmudullah (2003–04)
 Manjural Islam (1997–98)
 Marshall Ayub (2005–06 to 2007–08)
 Mazharul Haque (1999)
 Mehdi Hasan (2005–06)
 Mehedi Hasan Bappy (2013)
 Mehedi Hasan Milon (2013)
 Mehedi Hasan Miraz (2013 to 2015–16)
 Mehedi Hasan Rana (2013 to 2015–16)
 Mehrab Hossain senior (1994 to 1997–98)
 Mehrab Hossain junior (2005–06)
 Mithun Ali (2007 to 2007–08)
 Mobashir Khan (2009–10)
 Mohammad Al-Amin (1994)
 Mohammad Ali (1989–90)
 Mohammad Ashraful (1999–2000 to 2001–02)
 Mohammad Azim (2009)
 Mohammad Kalim (1999–2000)
 Mohammad Mostadir (1994 to 1995–96)
 Mohammad Nazmul Hossain (2003–04 to 2004)
 Mohammad Rubel (2009)
 Mohammad Saddam (2013–14)
 Mohammad Saifuddin (2013 to 2015–16)
 Mohammad Salim (1999–2000)
 Mohammad Shakil (2007 to 2007–08)
 Mohammad Shariful (2001–02)
 Mohammad Sukran (2007–08)
 Mohammad Sumon (2013 to 2013–14)
 Mominul Haque (2009 to 2009–10)
 Morshed Alam (1997–98)
 Morshed Ali Khan (1994 to 1995–96)
 Mosaddek Hossain (1999 to 1999–2000)
 Mosaddek Hossain (2010–11 to 2014)
 Mossabbek Hossain (2014–15 to 2015–16)
 Munim Shahriar (2010–11 to 2014–15)
 Murad Khan (2001–02)
 Mushfiqur Rahim (2004 to 2005–06)
 Mushfiqur Rahman (1997–98)
 Mustafizur Rahman (2013 to 2013–14)

N
 Nabil Samad (2005–06)
 Nadif Chowdhury (2003–04 to 2004)
 Nadimuddin (2007–08)
 Naeem Islam senior (2003–04)
 Naeem Islam junior (2010–11 to 2012)
 Nafees Iqbal (2001–02 to 2004)
 Nahid Hasan (2013–14 to 2014–15)
 Nahidul Haque (1999 to 1999–2000)
 Naimur Rahman (1994 to 1995–96)
 Nasir Hossain (2007 to 2007–08)
 Nasum Ahmed (2010–11 to 2012)
 Nazimuddin (2003–04 to 2004)
 Nazmul Hossain Milon (2005–06)
 Nazmul Hossain Shanto (2013 to 2015–16)
 Nazmus Sadat (2005–06)
 Niamur Rashid (1994–95)
 Nihaduzzaman (2013 to 2014–15)
 Noor Hossain (2009 to 2012)
 Nurul Hasan (2009 to 2012)
 Nuruzzaman (2011–12)

P
 Pinak Ghosh (2014–15 to 2015–16)
 Prosenjit Das (2013–14 to 2015)

R
 Hasibul Hasan Rakib (unlimited time)
 Rahatul Ferdous (2013 to 2013–14)
 Raihan Anas (2007 to 2007–08)
 Rajin Saleh (1999 to 1999–2000)
 Rakib Hasan (1994)
 Ranjan Das (1999 to 1999–2000)
 Raqibul Hasan (2005–06)
 Rashidul Haque (1997–98)
 Rezaul Haque (1999)
 Rezaul Islam (2005–06)
 Rifat Pradhan (2013 to 2015–16)
 Rony Talukdar (2007 to 2007–08)
 Rubaiyat Haque (2003–04 to 2004)
 Rubel Hossain (2007 to 2007–08)

S
 Sabbir Khan (1997–98)
 Sabbir Rahman (2009 to 2009–10)
 Saddam Hossain (2009)
 Saddam Hossain (2010–11)
 Saddam Khan (2009)
 Sadik Hasan (1999)
 Saeed Sarkar (2013 to 2015–16)
 Saghir Hossain (2003–04)
 Saif Hassan (2014–15 to 2015–16)
 Saiful Islam (1989–90)
 Saikat Ali (2007–08 to 2009–10)
 Sajal Chowdhury (1994 to 1997–98)
 Sajid Hasan (1994–95 to 1995–96)
 Sajjad Ahmed (1994–95)
 Saleh Ahmed (2014 to 2015–16)
 Salman Hossain (2010–11 to 2012)
 Sanjit Saha (2014 to 2015–16)
 Selim Shahid (1989–90)
 Shadman Islam (2013 to 2014–15)
 Shafaq Al Zabir (2001–02)
 Shafiul Alam (2001–02)
 Shafiul Hayat (2014–15 to 2015–16)
 Shahadat Hossain, Albahani Ltd (2009)
 Shahadat Hossain (2003–04 to 2004)
 Shahanur Rahman (2014–15 to 2015)
 Shahnawaz Kabir (1997–98)
 Shahriar Hossain (1994 to 1995–96)
 Shahriar Nafees (2003–04 to 2004)
 Shaker Ahmed (2009 to 2009–10)
 Shakib Al Hasan (2005–06)
 Shamsul Huda (1989–90)
 Shamsur Rahman (2004 to 2005–06)
 Shariful Haque (1994–95)
 Shohag Raza (2009)
 Sifat Islam (2013–14 to 2014)
 Sirajullah Khadim (2005–06)
 Sohail Islam (1994 to 1994–95)
 Soumya Sarkar (2009–10 to 2012)
 Subashis Roy (2007 to 2007–08)
 Suhrawadi Shuvo (2005–06 to 2007–08)
 Syed Rasel (2001–02)

T
 Taibur Rahman (2009)
 Taijul Islam (2009)
 Talha Jubair (2001–02 to 2004)
 Tamim Iqbal (2005–06 to 2007–08)
 Tanveer Khan (1997–98)
 Tanvirul Islam (1997–98)
 Taposh Ghosh (2007 to 2007–08)
 Tarikul Hasan (1999 to 1999–2000)
 Tasamul Haque (2009 to 2009–10)
 Taskin Ahmed (2010–11 to 2012)
 Touhid Tareq (2010–11 to 2011–12)
 Towhid Hossain (1997–98)
 Tushar Imran (1999)

W
 Waseluddin Ahmed (2001–02)

Y
 Yasir Ali (2010–11 to 2013–14)

Z
 Zabid Hossain (2007 to 2007–08)
 Zahed Zabed (2010–11)
 Zakaria Imtiaz (1994 to 1994–95)
 Zakaria Masud (2010–11 to 2013–14)
 Zakir Hasan (2013–14 to 2015–16)
 Ziaur Rahman (2003–04)

References

Under-19